Hurlingham Park is a park and multi-use sports ground in Fulham, London, England. It is currently used mostly for rugby matches, football matches and athletics events and is the home of Hammersmith and Fulham Rugby Football Club.

The park served as the location for Monty Python's Upper Class Twit of the Year sketch. It had a seated capacity of around 2,500 people, until the stands were demolished in 2002.

History 

The opening meeting of the track was on 11 September 1954, the same date that the area became a public park. The running track was originally made of cinder. The field on which the track is situated was originally a polo ground and was compulsorily purchased by the Metropolitan Borough of Fulham from the Hurlingham Club after the Second World War.

A grandstand was built in 1936 to replace an earlier version but it was allowed to become run down in the 1990s and, in spite of strong local opposition, was demolished in 2002. It had a capacity of approximately 2,500 on bench type seating. The stadium has been replaced by a considerably smaller pavilion with no public facilities. The infield is a well maintained grass pitch and is used for either rugby union or football.

The track has a  straight on the home straight next to the grandstand which extends past the regular start line although the extension has been fenced off. The track was the base of London Athletic Club and the straight was last thought to be used for a race in 1979. A meeting was held with exactly the same schedule of events as the first open championship in 1879 and thus included a 220-yard straight race (200 metres)

The Monty Python sketch "The 127th Upper Class Twit of the Year Competition from Hurlingham Park" was filmed there in 1969.

See also
 South Park, Fulham

References

External links 

Sports venues in London
Fulham F.C. home grounds
Fulham
History of the London Borough of Hammersmith and Fulham
Sport in Hammersmith and Fulham
Parks and open spaces in the London Borough of Hammersmith and Fulham